is a former professional Japanese baseball player. He plays catcher for the Yomiuri Giants.  

Aikawa was a member of the Japanese national baseball team at the 2006 World Baseball Classic and 2013 World Baseball Classic. He also won the Bronze medal at the 2004 Olympic Games.

Aikawa is a Christian. Aikawa has spoken about his faith saying, "There are always hurdles and obstacles to overcome in daily life, but knowing God is there helps me get through difficult times. I wish more Japanese people would find Jesus Christ as I have, and I am thankful I have been able to play professional baseball for such a long time."

His younger brother, Juri, is an actor and model.

References

External links

 Career statistics - NPB.jp 

1976 births
Living people
People from Ichikawa, Chiba
Nippon Professional Baseball catchers
Yokohama BayStars players
Tokyo Yakult Swallows players
Yomiuri Giants players
Baseball players at the 2004 Summer Olympics
Olympic baseball players of Japan
Olympic bronze medalists for Japan
2006 World Baseball Classic players
Olympic medalists in baseball
2013 World Baseball Classic players
Medalists at the 2004 Summer Olympics
Japanese baseball coaches
Nippon Professional Baseball coaches
Japanese Christians